A brake Post Office stowage van is a type of rail vehicle built for use in a travelling post office.

British Rail built nine of these vehicles between 1959 and 1968, to two similar designs, both based on the Mark 1 coach design. They were numbered in the range 80450-80458. Following the Great Train Robbery, vehicles from 80456 onwards featured a revised design with smaller windows.

In the early 1970s, British Rail introduced the TOPS classification system. Vehicles were given the TOPS code NU, followed by an A if they were air-braked, V if vacuum-braked, or an X if they had both air and vacuum brakes.

Preservation 
All three of the latter-build Mk1 vehicles have been preserved. Also a survivor from GWR has also made it into preservation.

External links 
 Nene Valley Railway TPO Group - owners of preserved vehicle 80456
 Rail Vehicle Preservation - custodians of preserved vehicle 80458

British Rail coaching stock